The Piedmont Council (California) of BSA serves chartered organizations and BSA units located in the city of Piedmont, located in the East Bay hills and surrounded by the city of Oakland.  The council was first chartered in 1921, and by some measurements is the smallest in the BSA, but has a high level of activity and serves a high percentage of the available youth living in Piedmont.
The council is home to units of Scouts BSA, Cub Scouts, Venturing Crews, Police Adventures and Sea Scouts.

Piedmont Council is one of the six councils that serves the San Francisco Bay Area.

History

In 1910 the newly formed Piedmont Community Church with the Reverend John Evans Stuchell, first pastor of the church and an avid outdoorsman, was seeking a new type of organization for the boys of Piedmont. He had heard rumors of a new organization inspired by General Baden-Powell in England and decided to start one of his own.

The first organization meeting, held in October 1910, included 25 boys and parents who began a camping tradition every other weekend that sparked a movement that has impacted thousands of youth for generations.

On March 21, 1921, the council was Chartered by The Boy Scouts of America as the 42nd Council.

Today the Piedmont Council serves over 1048 youth in diverse programs ranging from Cub Scouts and Boy Scouts to coed teen programs including crews for Community Service, Sea Scouts & Police Explorers.
One of the Famous Ships of the Local Sea Scouts is the 33 feet long Sailboat the SSS Revenge operated by Ship 16[in the Sea Scouts Ship acts as Troop] has Participated in a United States Coast Guard Safety at Sea Events,Explored the Bay and Delta of San Francisco, and Competed in Old Sea Salt regattas.

Timeline

October 1910
First recorded Scout meeting and campout in Redwood Canyon; Organized by Reverend John Stuchell, First Pastor of Piedmont Community Church.

1921
Piedmont Council officially chartered with National BSA.
The Boy Pioneers established in Piedmont, one of the original models for the National Cub Scout Program

1929 – 1971
Camp Wallace Alexander served as the Council Summer Camp for hundreds of Scouts for 42 years.

1946
Sea Scouts Ship 16 “The Revenge” organized.

1954
First Pinewood Derby held in Piedmont

1969
First Scout Tree Lot becomes major Scout fundraiser in 1970, originally organized by the Corpus Christi Men's Club to benefit Troop 6.

1971
Exploring and Sea Scouts become co-ed.

1974
First Venturing Crew: Rowing Post 8 Founded by Edwin E. Liskiss, original organization that became Oakland Strokes

1978
First Career Day organized by Piedmont Council for Piedmont High School

2005
1000th Piedmont Council Scout receives the highest honor, Eagle Rank

2013
Nationally recognized Oakland Strokes Venturing Crew becomes independent from Piedmont Scouting organization

2016
Piedmont Council Awarded #1 out of 273 for Journey to Excellence Performance (JTE)

2017
National BSA announces Family Scouting and Eagle Scout program for girls

See also

Scouting in California

References
 https://www.piedmontbsa.org/about/piedmont-scouting-history/

Piedmont, California
1921 establishments in California
Boy Scout councils in California